In rhetoric, an anaphora ("carrying back") is a rhetorical device that consists of repeating a sequence of words at the beginnings of neighboring clauses, thereby lending them emphasis. In contrast, an epistrophe (or epiphora) is repeating words at the clauses' ends. The combination of anaphora and epistrophe results in symploce.

Functions
Other than the function of emphasizing ideas, the use of anaphora as a rhetorical device adds rhythm to a word as well as making it more pleasurable to read and easier to remember. Anaphora is repetition at the beginning of a sentence to create emphasis. Anaphora serves the purpose of delivering an artistic effect to a passage. It is also used to appeal to the emotions of the audience in order to persuade, inspire, motivate and encourage them. In Dr. Martin Luther King Jr.'s famous "I Have a Dream" speech, he uses anaphora by repeating "I have a dream" eight times throughout the speech.

Usage

Today, anaphora is seen in many different contexts, including songs, movies, television, political speeches, poetry, and prose.

Examples

See also 
 Epistrophe
 Epanalepsis
 Figures of speech involving repetition
 Ubi sunt

Notes

References

External links

What is Anaphora?: Oregon State Guide to English Literary Terms
Audio illustrations of anaphora
Anaphora Define Anaphora at Dictionary.com
Video example of the anaphora

Rhetorical techniques
Figures of speech
Poetic devices
Literary terminology